Ursula Elizabeth Finger-Morrison (5 July 1929 – 22 February 2015) was a German sprinter. Born in Saarbrücken, she competed in the women's 4 × 100 metres relay at the 1952 Summer Olympics representing Saar. She was the first woman to represent Saar at the Olympics.

See also
 Saar at the 1952 Summer Olympics

References

External links
 

1929 births
2015 deaths
Athletes (track and field) at the 1952 Summer Olympics
German female sprinters
German female long jumpers
Olympic athletes of Saar
Sportspeople from Saarbrücken
Saar athletes